Mustafa Hadid (born 25 August 1988) is an Afghan former footballer who played as a right-back or forward.

Club career
Born in Kabul, Hadid moved to Hamburg with his family in 2016 escaping the Third Afghan Civil War (1996–2001). He began his career 1998 in the youth side of TuS Germania Schnelsen before joining the U-19 of Hamburger SV in summer 2004. He played in the Under 19 Bundesliga for Hamburger SV and returned to his first club TuS Germania Schnelsen in 2006. After one season in the Oberliga Hamburg for TuS Germania Schnelsen he signed in summer 2007 for Eintracht Norderstedt. In August 2008, it was announced Hadid would play his former club Germania Schnelsen with Eintracht Norderstedt.

Hadid joined Altona 93 in 2009, where he was deployed as a right-back instead of a forward as he had been previously. In April 2016, while at Altona 93, he suffered an Anterior cruciate ligament injury in match against former club Eintracht Norderstedt.

International career
Hadid played in Afghanistan national team's first friendly match at home in ten years against Pakistan. He won the 2013 SAFF Championship with Afghanistan. In January 2016, he competed with Afghanistan at the 2015 SAFF Championship. He played the full 120 minutes in the final against India which Afghanistan lost 2–1.

Personal life
Hadid studied Environmental technology at the Hamburg University of Applied Sciences in Bergedorf.

Career statistics

Club

International
Scores and results list Afghanistan's goal tally first, score column indicates score after Hadid goal.

Honours
Afghanistan
 SAFF Championship: 2013, runner-up 2015

References

Living people
1988 births
Afghan footballers
Association football forwards
Afghanistan international footballers
German footballers
Footballers from Kabul
German people of Afghan descent
Hamburger SV players
FC Eintracht Norderstedt 03 players
Altonaer FC von 1893 players